The Patriotic Front was a political party in Cyprus led by Glafcos Clerides.

History
The party was formed in 1959 as a replacement for the United Democratic Reconstruction Front by a loose coalition of supporters of Makarios III, including the district leaders of EOKA.

The Front won the pre-independence elections in 1960, taking 30 of the 35 seats reserved for Greek Cypriots. However, the party was dissolved in the late 1960s, breaking into several factions, including Eniaion, the Progressive Front, the Progressive Party and the Democratic National Party.

Ideology
The party was initially a personal party for Makarios III, but later evolved into a conservative and nationalist party.

References

Defunct political parties in Cyprus
Greek Cypriot nationalism
Political parties established in 1959
1959 establishments in Cyprus